Brian James Davis (August 5, 1914 – July 15, 1993), better known as David Brian, was an American actor. He is best known for his role in Intruder in the Dust (1949), for which he received critical acclaim and a Golden Globe nomination. Brian's other notable film roles were in The Damned Don't Cry (1950), This Woman Is Dangerous (1952), Springfield Rifle (1952), Dawn at Socorro (1954), and The High and the Mighty (1954).

On February 8, 1960, Brian was awarded a star on the Hollywood Walk of Fame at 7021 Hollywood Boulevard.

Early years
Brian was born Brian Davis in New York City. After school at City College, he found work as a doorman, then entered show business with a song-and-dance routine in vaudeville and in night clubs. He did a wartime stint with the United States Coast Guard during World War II and returned to acting on the New York stage after the war.

Film
Persuaded by Joan Crawford to try his hand at film acting, Brian joined her in Hollywood and, in 1949, signed a contract with Warner Bros. The New York City native appeared in such films as Flamingo Road (1949) and The Damned Don't Cry! (1950) with Joan Crawford, and Beyond the Forest (1949) with Bette Davis. He also had a role in the film Springfield Rifle (1952), which starred Gary Cooper, and in the John Wayne movie The High and the Mighty (1954) as Ken Childs.

Brian was nominated for a Golden Globe Award as Best Supporting Actor for his role in Intruder in the Dust  (1949).

Television
In the 1950s and 1960s, Brian was active in television with guest roles in dozens of shows ranging from dramatic to comedic, from Rawhide to I Dream of Jeannie. In 1954 and 1955, he portrayed the lead character on the TV show Mr. District Attorney.

Brian has a star in the television section of the Hollywood Walk of Fame. It was dedicated on February 8, 1960.

Personal life
Brian was married to Bonita Fiedler; they divorced in 1948. In 1950, she filed a paternity suit against him, seeking his support for a son born to her. The suit claimed that Brian had admitted to being the baby's father. Brian's attorney, on the other hand, said that Brian did not think he was the child's father. At the time of the suit, Brian was married to Adrian Booth, an actress known as Lorna Gray. On August 11, 1951, a jury found in Brian's favor after another man testified to having been intimate with the mother "several times during the year before the child was born".

Brian's marriage to Booth also had legal problems. In 1949, columnist Jimmie Fidler reported that Booth's "recent marriage to actor David Brian has been set aside by an L.A. judge because of illegalities in his divorce from a former mate".

Death
Brian died July 15, 1993, of heart disease and cancer in Sherman Oaks, California.

Filmography

Film

Television

References

External links

 
 

1914 births
1993 deaths
American male dancers
American male film actors
American male television actors
Deaths from cancer in California
Male actors from New York City
People from Greater Los Angeles
20th-century American male actors
20th-century American dancers
Male Western (genre) film actors
City College of New York alumni
United States Coast Guard personnel of World War II